The Penal Colony: Stories and Short Pieces is a collection of short stories and recollections by Franz Kafka, with additional writings by Max Brod. First published in 1948 by Schocken Books, this volume includes all the works Kafka intended for publication, and published during his lifetime (the only exception is "The Stoker", which serves as a first chapter for the novel Amerika). It also includes critical pieces by Kafka, "The First Long Train Journey" by Kafka and Brod (which was initially intended to be the first chapter of a book), and an Epilogue by Brod. The collection was translated by Willa and Edwin Muir.

Contents
 Conversation with the Supplicant
 a slightly different version from the text of the dialogue as it appears in the story Description of a Struggle
 Meditation
 Children on a Country Road
 The Trees
 Clothes
 Excursion into the Mountains
 Rejection
 The Street Window
 The Tradesman
 Absent-minded Window-gazing
 The Way Home
 Passers-by
 On the Tram
 Reflections for Gentlemen-Jockeys
 The Wish to be a Red Indian
 Unhappiness
 Bachelor's Ill Luck
 Unmasking a Confidence Trickster
 The Sudden Walk
 Resolutions
 The Judgment
 The Metamorphosis
 A Country Doctor
 The New Advocate
 A Country Doctor
 Up in the Gallery
 An Old Manuscript
 Before the Law
 Jackals and Arabs
 A Visit to a Mine
 The Next Village
 An Imperial Message
 The Cares of a Family Man
 Eleven Sons
 A Fratricide
 A Dream
 A Report to an Academy
 The Bucket Rider
 In the Penal Colony
 A Hunger Artist
 First Sorrow
 A Little Woman
 A Hunger Artist
 Josephine the Singer, or The Mouse Folk
 Appendix
 The First Long Train Journey - by Kafka and Brod
 The Aeroplanes at Brescia
 Three Critical Pieces
A Novel about Youth - Review of Felix Sternheim's Die Geschichte des jungen Oswald
On Kleist's "Anecdotes"
Hyperion - Review of the literary magazine
 Epilogue by Max Brod

References

Kafka, Franz. The Penal Colony: Stories and Short Pieces. New York: Schocken Books, 1948. 

Short story collections by Franz Kafka
Translations into English
1948 short story collections
Books published posthumously
Schocken Books books